Tropa is a Portuguese word equivalent to the English troop. It may refer to:

 Tropa de Elite, a 2007 Brazilian movie
 Tropa de Elite 2, the 2010 sequel
 Team Robredo–Pangilinan (TRoPa), a 2022 Philippine election coalition
 Francisco Tropa (born 1968), Portuguese sculptor
 A nickname for the Russian P-15 radar

See also